Todd Brian Holmes (born 14 July 1979) is a former Australian rules footballer who played with the West Coast Eagles in the Australian Football League (AFL).

A half back from Kalgoorlie, Holmes was only able to make seven appearances in the seniors and twice finished a game without a disposal.

Holmes never once played in a win while with the Eagles but had more success in the WAFL where he was a Subiaco premiership player in 2004 and 2006. Despite playing 20 games in 1997, he missed selection in the grand final but did play in the reserves premiership.

He represented the Western Australian interstate football team on two occasions, having previously represented his state in the Under-17s and Under-18s.

References

External links
 
 

1979 births
Australian rules footballers from Western Australia
West Coast Eagles players
Subiaco Football Club players
Claremont Football Club players
Kalgoorlie City Football Club players
Living people
People from Kalgoorlie